Desmond Miller also known as Jackie Dee (born March 26, 1969) is an American hairstylist. Miller was a recipient of the 2001 Prime Time Emmy Award for Outstanding Hairstylist for a Series for his work on MadTV. He has also performed as a dancer in Wigstock: The Movie in 1995, had one acting role on VIP in 1999, and one acting role as a drag queen on MADtv in 2002.

References

External links
 

American hairdressers
Living people
1969 births